ePlus inc. is an American IT assets selling and financing company headquartered in Herndon, Virginia. The company was formerly known as MLC Holdings, Inc. and changed its name to ePlus, inc. in 1999.

History and operations
The company has two segments: Technology and Financing. The technology segment provides services to IT companies, including Cisco Systems, Hewlett Packard, Apple Inc., Dell and Microsoft. The financing division is engaged in providing equipment, software and relevant solutions to government and government-oriented entities. In November 2013, the company's subsidiary, ePlus Technology Inc, acquired Advistor Inc.

On February 4, 2014, the company expanded its Managed Services operations with a new center, which is ePlus' third Managed Services Center in the United States in the Raleigh, North Carolina, area. The company provides customers with lifecycle management, and financing for IT products and services.

In July 2022, ePlus acquired Future Com, Ltd., a Texas-based provider of cyber security solutions.

References

Technology companies established in 1990
Companies based in Fairfax County, Virginia
Companies listed on the Nasdaq